Qalandarabad (also Romanized as Qalandarābād) is a city and capital of Qalandarabad District, in Fariman County, Razavi Khorasan Province, Iran. At the 2006 census, its population was 4,872, in 1,168 families.

References 

Populated places in Fariman County
Cities in Razavi Khorasan Province